Dan Frazier may refer to:
 Dan Frazier (rugby union)
 Dan Frazier (artist)

See also
 Daniel Frazier, namesake of the destroyer USS Frazier
 Daniel Fraser (disambiguation)